Skenea catenoides is a species of sea snail, a marine gastropod mollusk in the family Skeneidae.

Description
The size of the shell attains 1.1 mm. The shell is widely umbilicated, closely spirally striated throughout, with several spiral chain-like lines on the base. The whorls are convex, regularly increasing.

Distribution
This species occurs in the Mediterranean Sea off Spain, Portugal and in the Atlantic Ocean off the Canary Islands.

References

 Monterosato T. A. (di), 1877 (maggio)a: Notizie sulle conchiglie della rada di Civitavecchia; Annali del Museo civico di Genova 9 (1876–1877): 407–428
 Piani P. (1980). Catalogo dei Molluschi conchiferi viventi nel Mediterraneo. Bollettino Malacologico 16(5–6): 113–224
 Gofas, S.; Le Renard, J.; Bouchet, P. (2001). Mollusca, in: Costello, M.J. et al. (Ed.) (2001). European register of marine species: a check-list of the marine species in Europe and a bibliography of guides to their identification. Collection Patrimoines Naturels, 50: pp. 180–213

External links
 Oliverio, Marco (2006). Gastropoda Prosobranchia archeo, in: Revisione della Checklist della fauna marina italiana
 Ancey C.F. (1898). List of marine shells collected at Port Gueydon, Kabylia, with description of a new Cyclostrema. The Nautilus. 12: 52–57
 

catenoides
Gastropods described in 1877